Finland women's national goalball team is the women's national team of Finland.  Goalball is a team sport designed specifically for athletes with a vision impairment.  The team takes part in international competitions.

Paralympic Games  
 

The team competed at the 1992 Summer Paralympics in Barcelona, where they finished first. At the 1996 Summer Paralympics in Atlanta, Georgia, the team finished second. The team competed at the 2000 Summer Paralympics in Sydney, where they finished fourth. At the 2004 Summer Paralympics in Athens, Greece, the team finished fourth.

World Championships  

The 1986 World Championships were held in Roermond, the Netherlands. The team was one of ten teams participating, and they finished fourth overall. The 1990 World Championships were held in Calgary, Alberta, Canada.  The team was one of seven teams participating, and they finished third overall. The 1994 World Championships were held in Colorado Springs, Colorado.  The team was one of nine teams participating, and they finished first overall. The 1998 World Championships were held in Madrid, Spain.  The team was one of eleven teams participating, and they finished first overall.

IBSA World Games  

The 2003 IBSA World Games were held in Quebec City, Canada with 10 teams competing.  The first stage was pool play with 5 teams per pool and the top two teams in each pool advancing to the next round. The team made it out of the round robin round.  Finland finished first after winning 1 to 0 in over time against Brazil. The 2007 IBSA World Championships and Games were held in Brazil.  The women's goalball competition included thirteen teams, including this one.  The competition was a 2008 Summer Paralympics qualifying event. Páiri Tolpanen was fourth in the competition in scoring with 18 points.  Katja Heikkinen was ninth in the competition in scoring with 12 points.

Regional championships 

The team competes in the IBSA Europe goalball region.  

The 1985 European Championships were held in Olsztyn, Poland with six teams competing.  The team finished third. The 2001 European Championships were held in Neerpelt, Belgium with six teams competing.  The team finished second. In 2005, the European Championships were held in Neerpelt, Belgium.  With ten teams competing, the team finished sixth. The Turkish Blind Sports Federation hosted the 2007 IBSA Goalball European Championships in Anyalya, Turkey with 11 teams contesting the women's competition. The team finished first. Munich, Germany hosted the 2009 European Championships with eleven teams taking part.  The team finished the event in third place. Senni Posio was the only team member to play and not score a goal.

The team competed at the 2013 European Championships in Turkey, where they finished fourth.

Goal scoring by competition

Competitive history 
The table below contains individual game results for the team in international matches and competitions.

References

Goalball women's
National women's goalball teams
Finland at the Paralympics
European national goalball teams